Schiermonnikoog Frisian is the most endangered of West Frisian languages, spoken by no more than 50 to 100 people (out of an island population of 900 people) at the island of Schiermonnikoog (Skiermûntseach).

West Frisian language
Schiermonnikoog